Layonel Rasakovich Adams (born 9 August 1994) is a Russian football player who plays for Khujand.

Career

Club
Adams made his professional debut in the Russian Football National League for FC Yenisey Krasnoyarsk on 16 March 2014 in a game against FC SKA-Energiya Khabarovsk.

On 16 March 2022, Adams signed for Armenian Premier League club FC Van.

On 14 June 2022, Budućnost Podgorica announced the signing of Adams.

On 3 February 2023, Tajikistan Higher League club Khujand announced the signing of Adams.

Career statistics

Club

Personal life
Adams' father is Nigerian and his mother Russian. His brother Lyukman Adams is Olympic triple jumper.

References

External links
 
 
 

1994 births
Living people
Russian footballers
Russian people of Nigerian descent
Footballers from Saint Petersburg
Association football defenders
Russian expatriate footballers
Expatriate footballers in Armenia
Expatriate footballers in Spain
Expatriate footballers in Belarus
Expatriate footballers in Kazakhstan
Expatriate footballers in Montenegro
Armenian Premier League players
Segunda División B players
Belarusian Premier League players
PFC CSKA Moscow players
FC Yenisey Krasnoyarsk players
FC KAMAZ Naberezhnye Chelny players
FC Urartu players
FC Isloch Minsk Raion players
FC Caspiy players
FC Turan players
FC Van players
FK Budućnost Podgorica players